Events from the year 1512 in France

Incumbents
 Monarch – Louis XII

Events
Ongoing since 1508 – War of the League of Cambrai
10 August – The Battle of Saint-Mathieu, a naval battle between an English fleet of 25 ships and a Franco-Breton fleet of 22 ships.

Births

15 January – Robert IV de La Marck, Duke of Bouillon, Seigneur of Sedan and a Marshal of France (d. 1556)

Full date missing
Thomas Sébillet, jurist, essayist and neo-Platonist grammarian (d. 1589)
Charles de Sainte-Marthe, Protestant and theologian (d. 1555)
Antonio Lafreri, engraver, cartographer and publisher (d. 1577)

Deaths

January – Jean Braconnier, singer and composer
July – Gilles Mureau, composer and singer (born c. 1450)
13 December – Emery d'Amboise, Grand Master of the Knights Hospitaller (b. 1434)
Unknown – Antoine Vérard, publisher, bookmaker and bookseller (born before 1485)

See also

References

1510s in France